Muthoni Drummer Queen or Muthoni Ndonga is a Kenyan rapper, drummer and cultural entrepreneur. She produces alternative electro-hip-hop music and founded the festivals Africa Nouveau and Blankets & Wine in East Africa.

Biography
Muthoni Ndonga was born and raised in Nairobi in Kenya. She wanted to become an artist since childhood, but her modest middle class parents tried to discourage her.

She developed her passion in choirs at school until 2004 when, as a student, she organized her first concert with the help of her friends. In 2008, after having obtained her diploma in international relations and philosophy at the Kenyan university  United States International University Africa  (USIU Africa), believing that alternative music has little visibility in Kenya, she founded the festival ' 'Blankets & Wine'

References

Musicians from Nairobi
21st-century Kenyan women singers
Kenyan women rappers
Living people
Year of birth missing (living people)